The 1967 Missouri Tigers football team was an American football team that represented the University of Missouri in the Big Eight Conference (Big 8) during the 1967 NCAA University Division football season. The team compiled a 7–3 record (4–3 against Big 8 opponents), finished in fourth place in the Big 8, and outscored opponents by a combined total of 134 to 76. Dan Devine was the head coach for the 10th of 13 seasons. The team played its home games at Memorial Stadium in Columbia, Missouri.

The team's statistical leaders included Barry Lischner with 647 rushing yards, Gary Kombrink with 452 passing yards and 972 yards of total offense, Chuck Weber with 212 receiving yards, and Jay Wallace with 27 points scored.

Schedule

References

Missouri
Missouri Tigers football seasons
Missouri Tigers football